Stretton State College is an independent coeducational public school based in Stretton in Brisbane, Queensland, Australia. The college has a total enrolment of approximately 3070 students across the primary (Gowan) and secondary (Illaweena) campuses, located at 226 Illaweena Street, which is on the land on the adjacent side of Gowan Road from the Primary Campus.

Organisation 
Stretton State College's current role of Executive Principal is held by Jan Maresca. The college also consists of two Campus Principals, with the role of the Gowan Campus Principal held by Racheal Jones and the role of the Illaweena Campus Principal held by Meryl Johnston. Other staff at Stretton State College include eight Deputy Principals (four at the Junior Campus and four at the Senior Campus), three Business Services Managers, fourteen Heads of Department (three at the Junior Campus and eleven at the Senior Campus), three Year Level Coordinators (Senior Campus), two Excellence Program Coordinators, two Guidance Officers (one at each campus), 82 teaching staff at the Junior Campus and 77 teaching staff at the Senior Campus.

Curriculum

Excellence programs
Stretton State College offers the following three Excellence Programs to students across both campuses:
 Lighthouse Academic Excellence Program
 Karawatha Cluster High Achievers Program
 Sports Academy Excellence Program

Junior Campus
Students enrolled in the Junior Campus undertake subjects based on the Australian Curriculum including English, Mathematics, Science and History. Other subjects studied by students in the Junior Campus include Health & Physical Education, Technology, Italian (Years 5 and 6 only), Art, Music and Information Communication Technology (ICT).

Senior Campus

English
English is a compulsory core subject across the Year 7–10 curriculum. English subjects available to students in Years 11 and 12 include the General subjects of English and Literature, and the Applied subject of Essential English.

Mathematics
Mathematics is a compulsory core subject across the Year 7–10 curriculum. Mathematics subjects available to students in Years 11 and 12 include the General subjects of General Mathematics, Mathematical Methods and Specialist Mathematics, and the Applied subject of Essential Mathematics.

Humanities
The Humanities subjects of History and Geography are studied as compulsory core subjects across the Year 7–8 curriculum. In Year 9, History remains a compulsory subject whereas Geography becomes an elective subject and the elective subjects of Business Studies and Civics & Citizenship also become available. In Year 10, History remains a compulsory subject and is studied for one semester. Year 10 elective Humanities subjects include Business Studies, Civics & Citizenship, Geography and Specialist History. Humanities subjects available to students in Years 11 and 12 include the General subjects of Accounting, Ancient History, Business, Geography, Legal Studies and Modern History, and the Applied subject of Tourism Studies.

Science
Science is a compulsory core subject across the Year 7–10 curriculum. Year 10 elective Science subjects include Physical Sciences and Life Sciences. Science subjects available to students in Years 11 and 12 include the General subjects of Biology, Chemistry, Earth & Environmental Science and Physics, and the Applied subject of Science in Practice.

Chinese
Chinese is the Language Other Than English studied at Stretton State College and is undertaken as a subject in grade 4 to 8 (compulsory), taught by Mrs Wee And Mrs Wong

Health & Physical Education
Health & Physical Education is a compulsory core subject across the Year 7–9 curriculum. Year 10 elective Health & Physical Education subjects include Foundation Health & Physical Education and Health, Sport & Recreation. Health & Physical Education subjects available to students in Years 11 and 12 include the General subject of Physical Education and the Applied subject of Sport & Recreation.

The Arts
Students in Years 7 and 8 undertake the Arts subjects of Visual Arts and Music. Elective Arts subjects available to students in Years 9 and 10 include Drama, Media Arts, Music and Visual Arts. Arts subjects available to students in Years 11 and 12 include the General subjects of Drama, Music, Music Extension (Year 12 only), Visual Arts and Film, Television and New Media, and the Applied subject of Visual Arts in Practice.

Technology
Students in Years 7 and 8 undertake the Technology subjects of Food Studies and Industrial Technology & Design. Elective Technology subjects available to students in Year 9 include Design & Technologies, Digital Technologies, Food Technology, Junior Design and Junior Engineering, whereas Year 10 Elective Technology subjects include Certificate I in Manufacturing (Pathways) (MSM10216), Digital Technologies, Pre Design, Pre Engineering and Food, Nutrition and Hospitality. Technology subjects available to students in Years 11 and 12 include the General subjects of Design, Digital Solutions, Engineering and Food & Nutrition, and the Applied subject of Industrial Technology Skills.

Einstein's Course
Einstein's Course is a Science, Technology, Engineering and Mathematics (STEM) course available to academic students in Year 9. Students undertaking this course have opportunities to engage in scientific, mathematical and technological concepts and apply them to real-world STEM problems.

Newton's Course
Newton's Course is a course available to academic students in Year 10. Students undertaking this course have opportunities to increase their capacity to work mathematically, engage in inquiry and investigation techniques, and work as part of a team engaging in cooperative learning.

Vocational Education & Training
Vocational Education & Training (VET) courses available to students in Years 11 and 12 include:

 Certificate I in Construction (CPC10111)
 Certificate II in Engineering Pathways (MEM20413)
 Certificate II in Hospitality (SIT20316)

 Certificate III in Business (BSB30115)
 Certificate III in Fitness (SIS30315)

Extracurricular

Clubs and activities
 Happy Snappers
 Science Club

Music
 Instrumental Music Program
 Musical activities (school choirs and productions)

Other activities
 Borrow-a-bot
 Brain Bee (Neuroscience)
 Chess
 Griffith Biology (an opportunity for Years 11 and 12 students studying Biology to complete a university course)

References

External links

 

Public high schools in Brisbane
Educational institutions established in 2006
2006 establishments in Australia